Amanita pyramidifera is a basidiomycete mushroom of the genus Amanita found in eastern Australia. Growing in moist sites associated with eucalyptus forest or rainforest. The cap is 80 to 210 mm in diameter, covered in pyramid type scales which may be white or greyish brown. The stem is 50 to 90 mm long, white with pyramidal scales.

References

Pyramidifera
Fungi described in 1980
Fungi of Australia